Alex Gibson is an American music and sound editor, known for his work on films including Transformers, The Dark Knight Rises, Mad Max: Fury Road, Interstellar, Mission: Impossible – Rogue Nation, Terminator Genisys, Justice League, and Dunkirk, for which he won the Academy Award for Best Sound Editing at 90th Academy Awards. His other awards include a Primetime Emmy Award in 2008 for Outstanding Sound Editing for a Miniseries, Movie or a Special for the HBO miniseries John Adams, as well as a Grammy Award in 2009 for Best Score Soundtrack Album for a Motion Picture, Television or Other Visual Media for The Dark Knight. As a result, he is only one Tony Award away from an EGOT.

References

External links

British sound artists
Living people
Year of birth missing (living people)
Best Sound Editing Academy Award winners
Best Sound BAFTA Award winners
Primetime Emmy Award winners